Khusruabad may refer to:
 Khusruabad, Gilan
 Khusruabad, Hamadan
 Khusruabad, Kermanshah
 Khusruabad, Kurdistan